Yahidne is a Ukrainian village in Chernihiv Raion, around 140 km north east of Kyiv and around 15 km south of Chernihiv. The population was 318 people as of the 2001 census. It was occupied by Russian forces during the 2022 Russian invasion of Ukraine.

History
During the 2022 Russian invasion of Ukraine, the village was occupied by Russian forces who looted and destroyed much of it.  

Inhabitants reported how during the Russian occupation of the village, soldiers forced more than 300 residents, of whom approximately sixty were children, into the basement of a school at gunpoint, where they were held against their will from 5 March to 1 April.

Seven villagers were reportedly executed by Russian soldiers and ten people died due to the poor conditions in the basement. Reuters and al Jazeera have stated that, in total, at least twenty people have been killed or died; however, no official death toll has been published. The journalist Roman Nezhyborets was among those who were executed by Russian soldiers.

At the beginning of April, Russian forces began to withdraw from the village as part of the coordinated regional withdrawal from Northern Ukraine.

References 

Northeastern Ukraine campaign
Villages in Chernihiv Raion